Fundi-Mentals is a 2015 Kenyan  erotic comedy that was directed by Alexandros Konstantaras, who was also behind the House of Lungula that featured judge Ian Mbugua. The comedy has already been nominated in this year's Africa Magic Viewer's Choice Awards in the best actor in comedy award. The film stars Charlie Karumi, Gerald Langiri and Lizz Njagah.

Production
The word 'Fundamentals' is very popular among Kenyans, only that here it bears a different meaning from its original one. The word gained massive popularity after Ken Wa Maria, a local Kamba musician, sang a song entitled "Fundamentals" purportedly referring to the 'assets' of a woman and since then the word became Kenyan slang term for the latter. Judging from the title, House of Lungula and now Fundi-mentals, the very common 'naughty' and very familiar Kenyan slang for the storylines and this only means that the movies tell the Kenyan story. As the producer Alex Konstantaras revealed, the idea for Fundi-mentals was inspired by a scene during the filming of House of Lungula. "There is a scene where the main character (Gerald Langiri) pretends that he is a fundi who fixes a chimney in order to come out from a difficult situation and that scene inspired me to come up with a character about a fundi who thinks that he can fix anything using unprofessional means," Alex said. The actress Lizz Njagah announced in July 2014 that the movie will also be available in Luo and Kikuyu dialects.

Plot
The storyline of Fundi-mentals revolves around the lives of two Fundis (handymen), Joseph (Gerald Langiri) and his assistant Moses (Charlie Karumi) who like to think of themselves as the best Fundis in Kinoo estate despite their unorthodox methods of fixing things. But the entry of a new Multinational Service Company in town throws all this in jeopardy. To avoid going out of business, they introduce to their female customers a new type of Ex-press service with hilarious consequences.

Cast

Release and reception 
Fundi-Mentals  was released on February 12, 2015, in Nairobi. It was rated 18+ and during the release the audience was adults only.  Reviewing for KenyaBuzz Wangechi Maina wrote, "Expect to see Fundi-Mentals boldly talk about it [sex] in the way you talk about sex with your peers, no holds barred. This makes Fundi-Mentals relatable."

Awards and nominations

Kalasha international awards

See also

References

External links

2015 films
Kenyan comedy films